Nomadland is a 2020 American drama film directed, written, and edited by Chloé Zhao. Based on the 2017 non-fiction book Nomadland: Surviving America in the Twenty-First Century by Jessica Bruder, it stars Frances McDormand as a woman who leaves home to travel around the American West. The film's supporting cast includes David Strathairn, as well as real-life nomads Linda May, Swankie, and Bob Wells, as fictionalized versions of themselves. Nomadland had a one-week streaming limited release on December 4, 2020, and was released by Searchlight Pictures in selected IMAX theaters in the United States on January 29, 2021, and simultaneously in theaters and streaming digitally on Hulu on February 19, 2021. 

Nomadland garnered acclaim, becoming the third-highest rated of 2020 on Metacritic, which found it to be the most frequently ranked by critics and publications as one of the best films of 2020. It premiered on September 11, 2020, at the Venice Film Festival, where it won the Golden Lion, and also won the People's Choice Award at the Toronto International Film Festival. It was named one of the ten best films of 2020 by the National Board of Review and the American Film Institute, and received four nominations at the 78th Golden Globe Awards, winning Best Motion Picture – Drama and Best Director; in winning the latter award, Zhao became the second woman and the first Asian woman to do so.

Accolades

See also
 2020 in film
 List of awards and nominations received by Chloé Zhao
 List of awards and nominations received by Frances McDormand

References

External links
 

Nomadland
Nomadland,awards